is a Japanese actor and voice actor, son of stage director Tetsuya Oguri, and the youngest of 3 siblings, including older brother Ryo, who is also an actor.

He started in small roles as extra in the works in which his father and brother worked. He began his official acting career at the age of 13 in the TV drama Hachidai Shogun Yoshimune (1995). With over 100 credits to his name, Oguri has an extensive Japanese filmography, which includes Lupin the 3rd, Crows Zero and Gintama. He directed his first film in 2010, Surely Someday, a drama in which he had a cameo role. Oguri made his Hollywood debut in Godzilla vs. Kong in 2021. As a voice actor, in 2005, he lent his voice in Fullmetal Alchemist the Movie: Conqueror of Shamballa as Alfons Heiderich, as well as other characters in other series.

Career
Oguri made his TV debut in NHK's drama Hachidai Shogun Yoshimune in 1995.  

In 1998, after playing the bullied and abused child Noboru Yoshikawa in the drama Great Teacher Onizuka, he started to be recognized by the public. His acting in that drama attracted attention, and led to bigger roles. In 2000, he played a deaf person in Summer Snow. In 2002, he starred in the popular drama Gokusen, in which he played a part of a bully, rather than the bullied, as he did in Great Teacher Onizuka. Oguri rose to prominence after his breakthrough role in 2005, as 'Hanazawa Rui' in the popular drama Hana Yori Dango. In 2007, he starred in the drama Hanazakari no Kimitachi e as 'Izumi Sano', co-starring with Toma Ikuta and Maki Horikita. In 2008, Oguri took up another lead drama role in Binbō Danshi by playing an optimistic poor college student named 'Kazumi Koyama'. In 2009, he appeared as lead in the drama Tokyo Dogs as American detective 'So Takakura'. He reunited with Hana Yori Dango co-star Mao Inoue for the drama , which began airing in October 2010. In 2012, he costarred with Satomi Ishihara in Fuji TV's Rich man, poor woman as a young wealthy man 'Toru Hyuga', which earned him the first Best Actor award in 74th Drama Academy Award. 1n 2014, Oguri starred in semi-historic anime live action drama Nobunaga Concerto, as both high school student 'Saburo' and the warlord 'Nobunaga Oda'. He continued to appear in other history-based dramas. In 2015, he reunited with Toma Ikuta after seven years in the TBS drama Ouroboros as 'Tatsuya Danno'.

Oguri  appeared in 2006 as 'Shinichi Kudo' in the first Detective Conan live action movie Detective Conan: Shinichi Kudo's Written Challenge. In 2014, he was in the anime live action movie Lupin the third as the main character. And in 2017, he gave life to character Gintoki Sakata in the 1st. movie of the live action adaptation of anime Gintama, a role he reprised in 2 mini-series and another movie.

In November 2018, Oguri was cast in Godzilla vs. Kong, his Hollywood debut. The movie was released in theaters and on HBO Max in March 2021. He also appeared in films such as Sukiyaki Western Django, Let Me Eat Your Pancreas and Tsumi no Koe directed by Nobuhiro Doi (best known for directed Strawberry on the Shortcake, Be with You and Flying Colors)

In 2005, Oguri lent his voice as a voice actor in Fullmetal Alchemist the Movie: Conqueror of Shamballa, together with his brother Ryo. In 2009, he lent his voice as a voice actor once again in Wangan Midnight as 'Akio Asakura'.

He is also a director. His directorial debut was directing a commercial in 2009, but his major directorial debut on the big screen was a movie titled Surely Someday, which was released on July 17, 2010 nationwide in Japan. Oguri cast several of his good friends within the entertainment industry in the movie, such as Keisuke Koide as the lead starring role, Actresses Mao Inoue and Aya Ueto as cameos, and himself also making a cameo appearance in the movie.

On 2007, Oguri began appearing as navigator in Nippon Broadcasting System's radio program "All Night Nippon", which he carried (as "Oguri Shun no All Night Nippon") until 2010, with occasional special appearances after that. He was suggested to act as part of All Night Nippon for the PV of the song "Karensou" by newcomer group KEY GOT CREW.

In 2011, after the Tohoku earthquake and tsunami, he was part of a group of 71 actors and singers that appeared in the Suntory beverage company's commercials, singing the songs Miagete goran yoru no hoshi wo and Ue wo muite arukō. His singing voice has also been included in several stage appearances.

Personal life
In 2004, Oguri was in a relationship with then-Morning Musume (and former Tanpopo) member Mari Yaguchi. In 2017, Yaguchi admitted that after their relationship was publicized on weekly tabloids, she decided to leave the group in 2005 to continue dating him. They later ended their relationship in 2006.

Shun Oguri married actress and model Yu Yamada on March 14, 2012. They have four children, born in 2014, 2017, 2020 and 2022. According to reports made by an undisclosed acquaintance, the third child was born in April in Los Angeles, in the United States.

Filmography

TV drama

TV comedy program or show appearances

Film

Animation

Japanese dub

TV commercials
{| class="wikitable sortable"
! Year
! Title
! Role
! class="unsortable" | Notes
|-
| 2007
| The Japan Commercial Broadcasters Association (formerly NAB (National Association of Commercial Broadcasters in Japan)) CM no CM 4th series [Fresh] (Campaign 2007)
| 
| NAB's PSA "CM no CM" [Fresh] (Shun Oguri and Comasaru-kun)15 sec.ad240p
360p
|-
| 2008
| Ezaki Glico"Glico Chocolate" "Sazae san 25 years later" campaign
| Namino Ikura
| Ad Playlist Otona Glico Sazae san CM Playlist 
|-
| 2008
| Nissan "Nissan Note x The World of Golden Eggs" collaboration campaignCM x DVD
| Narrator
| Nissan Note x The World of Golden Eggs Eva Family (30 sec ver.)Rose & Mary (30 sec ver)Roberto and the coach (30 sec ver.)Rose & Mary (radio ver.)
"Nissan Note x The World of Golden Eggs" DVD back cover image 
|-
| 2008
| Au Sony Ericcson smartphones Sony Ericcson smartphones W61S / W62S smartphone (2008 Campaign)
| 
| W61S Cyber Shot smartphone30 sec. version30 sec. version
W62S Global Passport smartphone30 sec. version
|-
| 2009
| Au Sony Ericcson Walkman smartphones Sony Ericcson smartphones Walkman Premiere³ (cube) smartphone (2009 Campaign)
| 
| Premiere³ (cube) smartphone30 sec. versionShun Oguri as Orchestra conductor
Special Live at Sony Ericsson Walkman Phone press event on Feb. 12, 2009.Philharmonic Orchestra Conductor in a Concert Hall, feat. Ryota Fujimaki of Remioromen
|-
| 2009
| Au Sony Ericcson smartphones Sony Ericcson smartphones Bravia U1 (2009 Campaign)
| 
| Bravia U130 sec. version
|-
| 2009
| Ezaki Glico"Glico Cheeza" "I Love Cheeza" (2009 campaign)
|
| Glico Cheeza "I Love Cheeza" 15 sec. CM30 sec CM
|-
| 2011
| Suntory Beverage Company Tohoku Earthquake Charity Relief Campaign"Miagete goran yoru no hoshi wo" "Ue wo muite arukō"
|  
| Suntory Commercial compilation 
|-
| 2012
| Adidas / ABC-Mart Adidas Originals"All Originals 'L.A. TRAINER', 'ROD LAVER' & 'H3LIUM''' 2012 Spring / Summer Campaign"
|
| Adidas Originals15 sec. ad x 3 compilation<br/ >
|-
| 2013
| Suntory Beverage Company "Yamazaki Whiskey""Otoko to onna" campaign
|  
| Suntory Yamazaki Whiskey "Otoko to onna"60 sec. version ad30 sec. version ad
|-
| 2015
| Ezaki Glico"Glico Pretz" "Aoi tori ~ Suki desu chun chun" (2015 Campaign)
|  
| Pretz "Aoi tori ~ suki desu chun chun"30 sec CM and making of 
|-
| 2015
| Kenshi Yonezu's 2015 album "Bremen" CM spot
| Narrator
| "Bremen" CM voice over 
|-
| 2016
| Ezaki Glico"Glico Pretz""Neko ~ Nyaa" (2016 Campaign)
|  
| Pretz "Neko ~ Nyaa"30 sec CM and making of 
|-
| 2016
| Konami"Power Pros" (Jikkyō pawafuru puroyakyū)"Guki-!" / "Daijōbu" (2016 Campaign)
|  
| Power Pros (Jikkyō pawafuru puroyakyū) "Guki-!" / "Daijōbu"2 15 sec CM, comment and making of (Aoi Nakamura / Shun Oguri version) Power Pros (Jikkyō pawafuru puroyakyū) "Daijōbu" 15 sec CM, comment and making of (Shun Oguri version)
|-
| 2016
| NTT Solmare "Comic Cmoa" Comic Cmoa x Oguri Shun - Nobunaga Concerto Movie tie up campaign
|
| NTT Solmare "Comic Cmoa" x Oguri Shun - "Nobunaga Concerto Movie" tie up campaign15 sec version ad 
|-
| 2017
| Fujitsu "Arrows" NX F-01K smartphone and Arrows Tab Tablet
|
| Arrows smartphone and tablet cm  ("Warenai Deka" ~ Unbreakable Criminal) series (Co-starred with Takayuki Yamada)1-30 sec. and 2-60 sec. version ads, plus "Behind the scenes"  
|-
| 2017
| Right-on "Jeans Planet" (Campaign 2017)
|
| Right-On "Jeans Planet"30 sec. version ad   
|-
| 2017
| Right-on "High-Class Outer" (Campaign 2017)
|
| Right-On "High Class Outer"15 sec. version ad   
|-
| 2017
| Pepsi"Strong Zero" "Momotaro's Story" campaign
| Momotaro
| Pepsi Strong Zero "Momotaro's Story"Full version, 6-episode (from ep. 0) CM plus making of (Episode 4 features actor Jude Law as "Oni")
Campaign launch event video  
|-
| 2018
| Right-on "Washi Denim"  (Washi no kishi-hen) (Campaign 2018)
|
| "Washi denim" "Washi no kishi" 15 sec. version ad   
|-
| 2018
| Right-on "Salasala Back Number"  (Salasala de ikou-hen) (Campaign 2018)
|
| Right-On "Salasala Back Number"15 sec. version ad   
|- 
| 2018
| Right-on "Right-on 40th Anniversary" 「Re:American&Street」(Campaign 2018)
|
| Right-On "Right-on 40th Anniversary ~ Re:American&Street"30 sec. version ad  30 sec. version ad  30 sec. version ad 
|-
| 2018
| SMBC Bank—Barclays 「Have a good Cashless!」 "Thinking Man" Prologue (Campaign 2018)
|
| SMBC Bank "Have a good Cashless! ~ Thinking man series"60 sec. version ad  30 sec. version ad
|-
| 2018 
| Right-on "Right-on 40th Anniversary"  (Men's Winter clothing ~ The smell of winter)(Campaign 2018)
|
| Right-on "Right-on 40th Anniversary ~ Men's Winter clothing"30 sec. version ad  
|-
| 2018
| Fujitsu "Arrows" <br/ >Arrows Be F-04K smartphone
|
| Fujitsu Arrows  ("Warenai Deka" ~ Unbreakable Criminal) series' 4th video (Co-starred with Takayuki Yamada)30 and 15 sec.ads, plus behind the scenes  
|-
| 2018
| Suntory Beverage Company"Maker's Mark" (Suntory Maker's Mark CM “Hajimete no, craft bourbon”) (Campaign 2018)
|  
| Suntory "Maker's Mark~ Hajimete no, craft bourbon"30 sec. version ad 15 sec. version ad
|-
| 2019
| SMBC Bank—Barclays 「Have a good Cashless!」"Thinking Man" 1st episode (Campaign 2018-2019)
|
| SMBC Bank "Have a good Cashless! ~ Thinking Man Series" 1st. episode60 sec. version ad  30 sec. version ad Making of version
|-
| 2019
| Right-on "Washi Denim" (Washi no deai-hen) (Campaign 2019)
|
| Right-on "Washi Denim ~ Washi no deai"30 sec. version ad  15 sec. version ad   
|-
| 2019
| Suntory Beverage Company"Maker's Mark" (Oguri Shun sekai de ippon no botoru o tsukuru) (Campaign 2019)
|  
| Suntory "Maker's Mark ~ Oguri Shun sekai de ippon no botoru o tsukuru"43 sec. version ad 35 sec. version ad
|- 
| 2019
| Right-on "Right-on Spring Campaign" ("Haru ga kita, jiyū ni ikou." (Campaign 2019)
|
| Right-on "Haru ga kita, jiyū ni ikou" 30 sec. ad 
|-
| 2019
| Suntory Beverage Company"Maker's Mark" (Maker's Mark [Tasting in the dark]) (Campaign 2019)
|  
| Suntory "Maker's Mark ~ Tasting in the Dark series"1 min 43 sec. version ad 
|- 
| 2019
| SMBC Bank—Barclays 「Have a good Cashless!」"Thinking Man" 2nd episode (Campaign 2018-2019)
|
| SMBC Bank "Have a good Cashless! ~ Thinking Man Series" 2nd episode 60 sec. version ad  30 sec. version ad Making of version
|-
| 2019
|
| Right-on "Natsu no garage house"30 sec. version ad   
|-
| 2019
| Fujitsu Arrows Be3 F-02L smartphone(Fujitsu Arrows "Warenai deka ~ jūgeki-hen") (campaign 2019)
|
| Fujitsu Arrows  ("Warenai Deka" ~ Unbreakable Criminal) series "Jūgeki" version(Co-starred with Takayuki Yamada) Image ad   15 sec ad   30 sec ad  
|-
| 2019
| Suntory Beverage Company"Maker's Mark" (Maker's Mark [Tasting in the dark] "Otousan no hi ni ha, chotto ii mono wo" hen) (Campaign 2019)
|  
| Suntory "Maker's Mark ~ Tasting in the Dark Series"1 min version ad 
|-
| 2019
| SMBC Bank—Barclays 「Have a good Cashless!」 "Thinking Man"  3rd episode (Campaign 2019)
|
| SMBC Bank "Have a good Cashless! ~ Thinking man series" Episode 360 sec. version ad  30 sec. version ad
|-
| 2019
| AjinomotoFresh Frozen  (The ★ Chahan) (Ii ne) (2019 Campaign)
|  
| Ajinomoto "The ★ Chahan" "Ii ne"15 and 30 sec CM 
|-
| 2019
| Chubu Electric Power (Kurashi reboryūshon)Gas and electricity ads (kīwādo-hen) (2019 Campaign) (ōru denka-hen) (denki& gasu-hen)
|  
| Chubu Electric Power "Kurashi reboryūshon" (Lifestyle revolution)"Keyword" version 60 sec CM "Keyword" version 30 sec CM "All Electric" version 30 sec CM "Gas and electric" version 30 sec CM 

"Making of" version 
|-
| 2019 - 2020
| Suntory Beverage CompanyMaker's Mark (Maker's Mark "Ii koto attara") (campaign 2019 ~ 2020 (Re-issue))
|
| Suntory "Maker's Mark" "Ii koto attara" cm30 sec version CM15 sec version CM
|-
| 2019
| Taisho Pharmaceutical Taishō Kanpō Gastrointestinal (Taisho Kanpo "Motareru Asa" version) (campaign 2019)
|
| Taisho Pharmaceutical Taisho Kanpo "Motareru Asa" CM30 sec.version 15 sec.version
|-
| 2020
| AjinomotoFresh Frozen  (The ★ Shumai) (Shūmai no umai mise-hen) (2020 campaign)
|
| Ajinomoto Fresh Frozen"The ★ Shumai" "Shūmai no umai mise" version30 sec CM
 
15 sec.version

"Making of" video
|-
| 2020
| Suntory Beverage CompanyMaker's Mark (Maker's Mark "Chichi no hi") (campaign 2020)
|
| Suntory "Maker's Mark" "Chichi no hi" cm30 sec version CM60 sec version CM
|}

Bibliography

Photo books
 So (27 October 2003)
 Oguri Note (26 December 2006)
 High (21 September 2007)
 Shun x Genji (October 2007)
 Mika's Daydreaming Theater, Mika Ninagawa, Shueisha, 2008

Books
 Dōkyū sei: Aoi no Foto Essei Series -Personart- (25 March 2005)
 Oguri Shun First Stage (27 September 2006)

Essays
 I love movie,You love movie? in Shukan Zipper
 Oguri Shunpo Danyū Kurabu (Kinema Shunpo-sha)

Stage

Radio
Nippon Broadcast System's All Night Nippon
  (Oguri Shun's All Night Nippon R) (November 4, 2006)
  (Oguri Shun's All Night Nippon) January 3, 2007 - March 31, 2010)Audio of the first program, starring Shun Oguri, with guest Mao Inoue, and comments by other "Hana Yori Dango" co-stars 
  (Oguri Shun's All Night Nippon Surely Someday pre-release Special) (July 14, 2010 )
  (Oguri Shun and Nagasawa Masami's All Night Nippon Movie "Gaku: Minna no Yama" Special) (May 4, 2011)
  (Oguri Shun's All Night Nippon GOLD "Lupin the 3rd" Movie Special) (August 29, 2014)
  (Oguri Shun's All Night Nippon "Museum" Movie Public viewing eve Special) (November 11, 2016)

Videogames

Awards and nominations

Acting awards and nominations

Other Awards and nominations
(2012) Whiskey Hills Awards' "Best Whiskey Lover" * Event video

References

External links
 

1982 births
Living people
Japanese male child actors
Japanese male film actors
Japanese male stage actors
Japanese male television actors
Japanese male voice actors
Male voice actors from Tokyo Metropolis
People from Kodaira, Tokyo
Taiga drama lead actors
20th-century Japanese male actors
21st-century Japanese male actors